Weinglass or Weinglas is a German and Yiddish surname literally meaning "wine glass" and may indicate at the occupation of wine merchant.
Leonard Weinglass (1933–2001), American lawyer
Leonard "Boogie" Weinglass (born 1941), American businessman
Simona Weinglass, Israeli journalist

See also

References

German-language surnames
Yiddish-language surnames